Terence Bayler (24 January 1930 – 2 August 2016) was a New Zealand film, television, and stage actor. His most memorable roles were in Monty Python's Life of Brian (1979) and Harry Potter and the Philosopher's Stone (2001).

Biography
Bayler was born in Whanganui, the son of Amy (née Allomes) and Harold Bayler, a stagehand. His first film appearance was a starring role in New Zealand film Broken Barrier (1952). Bayler then spent the majority of his six-decade-long acting career in England, although he also appeared in 1981 New Zealand feature Pictures and BBC mini-series The Other Side of Paradise (1992), filmed partly in Raratonga.

Broken Barrier was the only locally made feature shot in New Zealand during the 1950s. Bayler starred as a young journalist who falls in love with a Māori woman. The film won healthy audiences in his home territory. It was directed by Roger Mirams and John O'Shea – O'Shea went on to direct the only New Zealand feature films made in the 60s, drama Runaway and musical Don't Let it Get You.

Bayler was given stitches above an eye after he was injured in a sword fight with actor Jon Finch (playing Macbeth) during the shooting of Roman Polanski's 1971 adaptation of Shakespeare's Macbeth. 

Bayler's associations with Monty Python date from 1975, when he appeared in Eric Idle's BBC TV series Rutland Weekend Television. This led to his appearance as Leggy Mountbatten, manager of fictional Beatles-parody band The Rutles, in American-made TV movie All You Need Is Cash (1978). Idle also cast him in his play Pass the Butler.

He had a small role as Mr. Gregory in Monty Python's Life of Brian (1979), and he appeared in two more of Python member Terry Gilliam's films, Time Bandits (1981) and Brazil (1985).

Filmography

Film

Television

References

External links

1930 births
2016 deaths
New Zealand male television actors
People from Whanganui
20th-century New Zealand male actors
21st-century New Zealand male actors
New Zealand male film actors
Alumni of RADA